The Reims Opera House, historically known as the  ("Grand Theater"), was built in 1873 over designs by Alphonse Gosset, in Reims, France. Its architecture was "explicitly inspired by the Paris opera house, then still under construction", especially the terraced roof. "It is notable for its opulent symbolic ornamentation on the theme of music and the lyric arts." The building was burnt down during World War I and rebuilt in 1931–1932 with an interior by François Maille and Louis Sollier. The auditorium's ceiling surrounding the chandelier was painted by René Rousseau-Decelle.

References

External links

 

Buildings and structures in Reims
Opera houses in France
Theatres completed in 1873
Theatres completed in 1932
19th-century architecture in France